Aesu Malayappan Chinnappa or A. M. Chinnappa is the Archbishop Emeritus of Madras-Mylapore and the Founder of the Society of God's Reign (Currently a Public Association). He was formerly Bishop of Vellore.

Biography
Chinnappa was born on 23 July 1937 at Ayandur which was then a substation of Mugaiyur Parish. He was ordained Priest of Salesians of Don Bosco on 16 December 1972. On November 17, 1993 he was appointed as the Bishop of Vellore by Pope John Paul II. He was ordained as the Bishop of Vellore on January 25, 1994 by Cardinal Duraisamy Simon Lourdusamy. On 1 April 2005 he was appointed as the Archbishop of Madras-Mylapore, the post he held until his retirement on 12 November 2012. On August 24, 2011 he founded a Religious Institute called Society of God's Reign.

See also
Catholic Church in India

References

 
 

 

1937 births
20th-century Roman Catholic bishops in India
21st-century Roman Catholic archbishops in India
Living people
Roman Catholic archbishops of Madras and Mylapore
Salesian bishops
Indian Roman Catholic archbishops>
Bishops appointed by Pope John Paul II